Leonardo Devanir de Paula or simply Leonardo (born March 12, 1977 in Juiz de Fora), is a Brazilian central defender who currently plays for Nova Iguaçu.

Career

Flamengo career statistics 
(Correct  13 July 2008)

according to combined sources on the.

Honours 
 Coritiba
 Paraná State Championship: 1999
Palmeiras
 Brazilian Série B: 2003
Goiás
Goiás State Championship: 2006

References

External links 
 sambafoot
 Guardian Stats Centre
 zerozero.pt
  goiasesporteclube.com

1977 births
Living people
People from Juiz de Fora
Brazilian footballers
Tupi Football Club players
Coritiba Foot Ball Club players
Goiás Esporte Clube players
Sociedade Esportiva Palmeiras players
CR Flamengo footballers
Vila Nova Futebol Clube players
Ipatinga Futebol Clube players
Expatriate footballers in Syria
Association football defenders
Syrian Premier League players